Jorvan Vieira (born September 29, 1953) is a Brazilian-Portuguese football coach and former player who played for Botafogo, Vasco da Gama and Portuguesa in the Brazil Serie A, and a current manager of  ENPPI.

Career

Playing career
Vieira was born in Duque de Caxias, Rio de Janeiro state, Brazil. He began his professional football career after studying Sports Medicine for four years, playing for top Brazilian clubs Vasco da Gama, Botafogo and Portuguesa in the 1970s.

Coaching career
Vieira was appointed assistant manager to the Moroccan national side for the 1986 FIFA World Cup in Mexico. Alongside compatriot José Faria he led Morocco into the second round of the tournament as group winners ahead of England, Portugal and Poland,

He then managed the Kuwait under-20 side before having an impressive spell and leading Al Qadisiya to the Kuwaiti league title, which was followed by further success when he was in charge of Egyptian club Al-Ismaili in 2001. Vieira was re-appointed as the coach of the Oman Under-20 side in the same year. After spending a year in the job, Vieira went on to coach the Malaysia  Under-20 side before returning to Oman, where he led Al-Nasr Salalah to the Sultan Qaboos Cup, and was manager of Al-Ta'ee in Saudi Arabia.

On December 26, 2007, it was officially announced that Vieira signed a one-year contract with Mes Kerman F.C. in the Iran Pro League for an approximate fee of $640,000. Yet a few days later on December 29 the deal fell through due to financial reasons.

On February 2, 2008, Vieira signed an 18-month contract with AFC Champions League 2007 finalists Sepahan F.C. Vieira was sacked by Sepahan F.C. on June 9, 2008, 12 months before his contract would expire.

Vieira signed a one-year contract with Iraq on September 2, 2008 to manage them for the second time, where he led them in the Gulf Cup.

On August 10, 2013, Jorvan Vieira was named coach of Kuwait's national side. The Brazilian led Iraq's national side to success in the 2007 Asian Cup.

In October 2018 Jorvan Viera was named coach of Ismaily from Egypt. After a string of poor results sitting in the bottom of the league and getting knocked out of the 2018-19 Arab Club Champions Cup at the expense of Raja Casablanca on penalty's 4-2 he resigned on December 13, 2018 after only 2 months at the club.

Asian Cup success 
Less than two months ahead of the 2007 AFC Asian Cup finals Vieira was named coach of war-torn Iraq. He led them all the way to the final of the 2007 WAFF Championship but finished as runners-up after losing 1–2 in the final against Iran. After this tournament, Iraq played in the Asian Cup. Incredibly, he led Iraq to the 2007 Asian Cup title after stunning the pre-tournament favourites Australia in a 3–1 victory, edging Korea on penalties and finally upsetting regional heavyweights Saudi Arabia 1–0 in the final.

Personal life
 Jorvan Vieira is a Muslim. He converted to Islam while coaching Morocco, he says about this: "Reports have suggested that I converted to Islam but 'converted' is not the right term – I wasn't religious before. Nor is it true that I only became a Muslim because of my Arab wife, as has also been claimed".
 He can speak 7 languages, including Arabic.
 He holds a doctorate in sports sciences from France.
 He is the son of a Portuguese father, a Brazilian mother and is married to Khadija Fahim, a Moroccan woman. As the result of this he holds Brazilian, Portuguese and Moroccan nationalities.
 Jorvan thinks of himself mainly as being Portuguese, confesses that he always carries with him his Portuguese passport, and that his identification cards at football matches identify him as being Portuguese. In an interview to the Portuguese newspaper Diário de Notícias, he even states that in the future, he wants to live the rest of his life in Portugal, and that he plans to coach a Portuguese football club.

Managerial statistics

Honours

Manager
Iraq
AFC Asian Cup: 2007

References

External links
 Jorvan Vieira Profile at AFC Asian Cup Official Website
 Jorvan Vieira Profile at Soccerblog

1953 births
Living people
People from Duque de Caxias, Rio de Janeiro
Brazilian people of Portuguese descent
Converts to Islam from atheism or agnosticism
Brazilian Muslims
Brazilian Sunni Muslims

Portuguese footballers
Brazilian footballers
CR Vasco da Gama players
Associação Portuguesa de Desportos players
Botafogo de Futebol e Regatas players
Association football defenders

Brazilian football managers
Portuguese football managers
Qatar SC managers
AS FAR (football) managers
Wydad AC managers
Ittihad Tanger managers
Qadsia SC managers
Ismaily SC managers
Al-Ta'ee managers
ENPPI SC managers
Iraq national football team managers
2007 AFC Asian Cup managers
AFC Asian Cup-winning managers
Sepahan S.C. managers
Al-Ittihad Kalba SC managers
Baniyas SC managers
Al-Sharjah SCC managers
Zamalek SC managers
Kuwait national football team managers
Smouha SC managers
Étoile Sportive du Sahel managers

Brazilian expatriate football managers
Expatriate football managers in Qatar
Brazilian expatriate sportspeople in Qatar
Brazilian expatriate sportspeople in Oman
Expatriate football managers in Morocco
Brazilian expatriate sportspeople in Morocco
Expatriate football managers in Kuwait
Brazilian expatriate sportspeople in Kuwait
Expatriate football managers in Egypt
Brazilian expatriate sportspeople in Egypt
Brazilian expatriate sportspeople in Malaysia
Expatriate football managers in Saudi Arabia
Brazilian expatriate sportspeople in Saudi Arabia
Expatriate football managers in Iran
Brazilian expatriate sportspeople in Iran
Expatriate football managers in the United Arab Emirates
Brazilian expatriate sportspeople in the United Arab Emirates
Expatriate football managers in Tunisia
Brazilian expatriate sportspeople in Tunisia

Kuwait Premier League managers
Botola managers
Egyptian Premier League managers
Saudi Professional League managers
UAE Pro League managers
Tunisian Ligue Professionnelle 1 managers
Sportspeople from Rio de Janeiro (state)
Persian Gulf Pro League managers